The 1976–77 season was Aston Villa's 77th in the Football League and their second consecutive season in the top division.

Andy Gray and was joint winner of England's golden boot with Arsenal's Malcolm Macdonald in 1976–77. Gray's 29 goals helped Villa to a fourth-place finish and victory in the League Cup, and earned him the PFA Young Player of the Year and PFA Players' Player of the Year awards.

Diary of the season

31 Aug 1976: No fewer than nine teams are level on four points at the top of the First Division after three matches. Aston Villa lead on goal difference. Norwich City are the only team yet to register a point.

15 Dec 1976: Aston Villa beat Liverpool 5–1 in the League at Villa Park.

12 Mar 1977: The League Cup final ends in a 0–0 draw between Aston Villa and Everton at Wembley. Arsenal's 2–1 loss to Queens Park Rangers is their seventh consecutive League defeat, a club record.

16 Mar 1977: The Football League Cup final replay at Hillsborough ends in a 1–1 draw.

13 Apr 1977: The Football League Cup final is decided at the third attempt when Aston Villa beat Everton 3–2 in the second replay at Old Trafford. A last minute goal from Brian Little sends the trophy to Villa Park and prevents the possibility of a first-ever major English Cup Final penalty shoot-out.

16 May 1977: Ivor Linton made his debut in the First Division as a 17-year-old apprentice, as a substitute in a 1–0 home victory against Stoke City relegating the Potteries club. West Ham United and Queens Park Rangers win their last matches of the season to survive, and Bristol City keep their hopes alive by beating Liverpool 2–1. They go into their last match level on points with Coventry City and Sunderland.

League table

Results
Aston Villa's score comes first

Legend

Football League First Division

Squad

References

Aston Villa F.C. seasons
Aston Villa F.C. season